Christopher John Leaver  (born 31 May 1942) is an Emeritus Professorial Fellow of St John's College, Oxford who served as Sibthorpian Professor in the Department of Plant Sciences at the University of Oxford from 1990 to 2007.

Education
Leaver was educated at Lyme Regis Grammar School and Imperial College London where he was awarded a Bachelor of Science degree (first class) followed by a PhD in plant physiology in 1966.

Career and research
Leaver's area of expertise is in plant biochemistry, development, plant physiology and signalling; before his current positions, he has at the Department of Botany and Plant Pathology at Purdue University and the University of Edinburgh. During his career, Leaver held the following positions:

Botanist on the Imperial College Hornsund expedition, Spitzbergen, 1962 and Beerenberg expedition, Jan Mayen, 1963
Fulbright Scholar, Purdue University, West Lafayette, Indiana, United States, 1966–68
Lecturer at the University of Edinburgh 1969–80: , promoted to Reader in 1980
Science and Engineering Research Council (SERC) senior research fellow 1985–90
Professor of Plant Molecular Biology 1986–1990
University of Oxford Sibthorpian Professor of Plant Science, 1990–2007
Head of the department of Plant Sciences 1991–2007
Fellow of St John's College, Oxford 1990–
Emeritus Professor of Plant Science, University of Oxford 2008–

Awards and honours
Leaver was elected a Fellow of the Royal Society (FRS) in 1986. His nomination reads: 

Leaver was also awarded EMBO Membership in 1982, elected a member of the Academia Europaea in 1989 and appointed Commander of the British Empire (CBE) in the 2000 New Year Honours.

Personal life
Leaver's Who's Who entry lists his recreations as “walking and talking in Upper Coquetdale” in Northumberland.

References

Living people
Members of the European Molecular Biology Organization
Fellows of the Royal Society of Edinburgh
Commanders of the Order of the British Empire
Fellows of St John's College, Oxford
Statutory Professors of the University of Oxford
British biochemists
Purdue University faculty
Members of Academia Europaea
Academics of the University of Edinburgh
Fellows of the Royal Society
1942 births